Montenegrin women live in Montenegro, a country in southeastern Europe: a region commonly known as the Balkans. They belong to a group of people known as South Slavs. An early description of women from Montenegro comes from a column of The New York Times on November 5, 1880, wherein the newspaper said that "The Montenegrin woman takes an equal share of labor with the man at field-work, and she does all the carrying" in relation to travel by horse ride and other forms of transport by animals. The newspaper further described them to be engaged in knitting or spinning.

Physical attributes 

Status in society 
Women in Montenegro may either be living in a conservative and patriarchal Montenegrin society or a matriarchal society depending on the region of their residence. In a family unit that is headed by a male, a woman may act as a guide to the man regarding family matters. In modern times, Montenegrin people have a "caring attitude" to their women.

Fertility rate 
A report from the World Bank shows that the fertility rate (total births per woman) in Montenegro had been declining from 2002 to 2010. The trend was from 1.77 in 2002, then 1.68 in 2008, and 1.66 in 2010.

Notable Montenegrin women

Queen of Italy 
There are notable women in Montenegro in the history of Montenegro. One of them was Elena of Montenegro (1873–1952), the daughter of a former king of Montenegro, who became Queen of Italy. The English historian Denis Mack Smith described Elena of Montenegro, particularly as Italy's queen, as the most influential Montenegrin woman in history; Elena of Montenegro was able to convince her husband Victor Emmanuel III, who was during her time the King of Italy, to impose on Benito Mussolini the creation of an independent Montenegro, against the wishes of the fascist Croats and Albanians (who wanted to enlarge their countries with the Montenegrin territories). Her nephew Prince Michael of Montenegro never accepted the offered crown, pledging loyalty to his nephew King Peter II of Yugoslavia.

First female physician 

Another notable woman from Montenegro was Divna Veković (1886–1944), the first female medical doctor in Montenegro. Apart from being a physician during World War I, Veković was also a humanitarian and a literary translator. As a translator, she was the first to translate The Mountain Wreath (also known as The Mountain of Wreath) from the Montenegrin language into the French language; The Mountain Wreath is a well-known poem and play  in Serbian literature written by the Prince-Bishop and poet Petar II Petrović-Njegoš. Veković also translated other poems such as that of the  Serbian poet Jovan Jovanović Zmaj.

See also 
 Gender roles in post-communist Central and Eastern Europe

References

External links 

 
Montenegrin women
Montenegrin